Canoe Creek Indian Reserve No. 3, known officially as Canoe Creek 3, is an Indian reserve governed by the Canoe Creek/Dog Creek Indian Band, located four miles south of the mouth of Dog Creek into the Fraser River.

See also
List of Indian reserves in British Columbia
Canoe Creek (disambiguation)

References

Indian reserves in British Columbia
Geography of the Cariboo
Secwepemc